Massoud Farassati (also spelled Farasati or Ferasati) is an Iranian film critic. He used to regularly appear in the Iranian State Television programme Haft, hosted by Fereydoun Jeyrani and later by Behrouz Afkhami. He has published anthologies of writings about such classical filmmakers as Charlie Chaplin, John Ford, Alfred Hitchcock, Federico Fellini, Akira Kurosawa and Ingmar Bergman in Persian.

Views 
According to Saeed Kamali Dehghan of The Guardian, his views are close to those of the Iranian government. He is a harshly dismissive of Abbas Kiarostami's works.
Farassati uses the terms Siahnamayi and Festival Cinema to describe films he deems "exotic" to foreign audience and of only seeking to win awards in the West.
As of today, Ferassati appears on the show 'Ketab Baaz' with views regarding diverse subjects

Favourite movies 
 Vertigo | Alfred Hitchcock
 Saraband | Ingmar Bergman
 Army of Shadows | Jean-Pierre Melville
 Rio Bravo | Howard Hawks
 The Searchers | John Ford
 Detective Story | William Wyler
 Love in the Afternoon | Billy Wilder
 The Wrong Man | Alfred Hitchcock
 The Shop Around the Corner | Ernst Lubitsch
 Cries and Whispers | Ingmar Bergman

References 

 Biography in official website

Iranian film critics
People from Tehran
1951 births
Living people